RMS Orcades was a British passenger ship that Vickers-Armstrongs Ltd of Barrow-in-Furness built as an ocean liner in 1937. Her owner was Orient Line, which operated her between Britain and Australia 1937–39, and also as a cruise ship. The British Admiralty then requisitioned her and had her converted into a troopship.

In 1942 the  attacked her off South Africa. Orcades crew and gunners fought to fend off the submarine and save their ship, and it took U-172 two and a half hours and seven torpedoes to sink her. Orcades Master, Charles Fox, was decorated by the Crown and Lloyd's of London for his bravery and leadership.

Civilian service
Orcades is the Latin name for the Orkney Islands. She was the second of two sister ships;  having been completed in July 1935. At  each, Orion and Orcades were the two largest liners in Orient Line's fleet. The New Zealand-born modernist architect Brian OʼRorke designed the interiors of both ships.

Orion and Orcades were registered in London and their homeport was Tilbury. Their route took them via Gibraltar, Palma, Toulon, Naples, Port Said, Suez, Aden, Colombo, Fremantle, Adelaide and Sydney to Brisbane. When not operating their liner route, Orion and Orcades provided cruises to Scandinavia, the Baltic Sea, Mediterranean, Adriatic Sea and Atlantic islands.

Loss
On 9 October 1942 Orcades left Cape Town for Liverpool carrying 741 passengers, 3,000 tons of general cargo and 2,000 bags of mail. Her steering gear and port engine were disabled but she remained afloat, so most of her crew and passengers were able to prepare to abandon ship.

At 10:45 hrs U-172 hit her amidships with a third torpedo and she began to settle in the water, on an even keel but slightly down by the bow. She continued to make way with her starboard engine, and despite a heavy sea launched 20 lifeboats. One capsized but its occupants were rescued. Another became swamped; drifted away and its occupants were not seen again. A skeleton crew of 56 men remained aboard to try to save the ship, although she was making only  and running in circles. At 10:54 hrs U-172 fired a fourth torpedo but it missed.

U-172 surfaced in order to increase speed and overtake her, but Orcades gunners opened fire and the submarine had to dive again. At 12:49, 12:50 and 12:54 hrs U-172 hit the ship with three more torpedoes on her starboard side, breaking her back. She listed heavily to starboard and sank at about 13:00 hrs. 55 of her skeleton crew abandoned ship by launching her last four lifeboats and her liferafts, but her Chief Engineer, William Johnston, went down with the ship. A total of 45 people were lost. U-172 remained at periscope depth but shortly afterwards an Allied aircraft attacked her and drove her away, which prevented her from questioning survivors.

En route the destroyers encountered and engaged another submarine, but after she crash-dived they broke off the engagement to continue to Orcades. A few hours after the liner's sinking a Polish merchant ship, Gdynia America Line's  , reached Orcades boats. Despite the risk of further submarine attack, Narwik spent several hours rescuing 1,022 survivors and searching for three missing lifeboats until 03:30 hrs on 11 October. She then made for the South African coast, and after 10 hours Nizam and Foxhound joined her and escorted her into port.

Orcades Master, Captain Charles Fox, was made a CBE and awarded Lloyd's War Medal for Bravery at Sea.

Narwik Master, Captain Czeslaw Zawada, awarded Lloyd's War Medal for Bravery at Sea.

Orcades was he second largest liner sunk during world War II, behind [[RMS Empress of Britain (1930)|Empress of Britain]].

In 2014 the wreck of Orcades was discovered in 4800 meters of water by survey company Deep Ocean Search.

References

Sources
 
 

1936 ships
Ships built in Barrow-in-Furness
Cruise ships of the United Kingdom
Maritime incidents in October 1942
New Zealand design
Ocean liners of the United Kingdom
Ships sunk by German submarines in World War II
Steamships of the United Kingdom
Troop ships of the United Kingdom
World War II passenger ships of the United Kingdom
World War II shipwrecks in the Atlantic Ocean
Maritime history of Australia
Ships of the Orient Line